Rubén Etchebarne (born 8 September 1936) is a former Uruguayan cyclist. He competed at the 1960 Summer Olympics and the 1964 Summer Olympics.

References

External links
 

1936 births
Living people
Uruguayan male cyclists
Olympic cyclists of Uruguay
Cyclists at the 1960 Summer Olympics
Cyclists at the 1964 Summer Olympics
People from Mercedes, Uruguay
Pan American Games medalists in cycling
Pan American Games gold medalists for Uruguay
Cyclists at the 1963 Pan American Games